The 2016 Jacksonville Armada FC season is the club's second season of existence. The club will play in North American Soccer League, the second tier of the American soccer pyramid.

Roster

Staff
  Tony Meola – Head Coach
  Mark Lowry – Assistant Coach

Transfers

Winter

In:

Out:

Summer

In:

Out:

Friendlies

Competitions

NASL Spring season

Standings

Results summary

Results by round

Matches

NASL Fall season

Standings

Results summary

Results by round

Matches

U.S. Open Cup

Squad statistics

Appearances and goals

|-
|colspan="14"|Players who left Jacksonville Armada during the season:

|}

Goal scorers

Disciplinary record

References

External links
 

Jacksonville Armada FC seasons
American soccer clubs 2016 season
2016 North American Soccer League season
2016 in sports in Florida